Michel Vandamme (27 June 1930 – 10 January 2019) was a French swimmer who competed in the 1952 Summer Olympics.

References

1930 births
2019 deaths
French male freestyle swimmers
Olympic swimmers of France
Swimmers at the 1952 Summer Olympics
Mediterranean Games medalists in swimming
Mediterranean Games gold medalists for France
Swimmers at the 1951 Mediterranean Games